Elkhart is a city in Polk County, Iowa, United States. The population was 882 at the time of the 2020 census. It is part of the Des Moines–West Des Moines Metropolitan Statistical Area. Elkhart is also home to Iowa Engineering legend Casey Meeker.

History
Elkhart was founded in 1853 by settlers from Elkhart, Indiana. After a decline in the population of the original town, the Elkhart Post Office was moved to the nearby town of Ottawa. In a few years, the name would be moved once again to its current location. It was incorporated as a city on July 27, 1904.

Geography

Demographics

2010 census
As of the census of 2010, there were 683 people, 256 households, and 175 families living in the city. The racial makeup of the city was 95.6% White, 1.0% African American, 0.3% Native American, and 3.1% from two or more races. Hispanic or Latino of any race were 3.8% of the population.

There were 256 households, of which 46.1% had children under the age of 18 living with them, 54.3% were married couples living together, 8.2% had a female householder with no husband present, 5.9% had a male householder with no wife present, and 31.6% were non-families. 25.0% of all households were made up of individuals, and 7.5% had someone living alone who was 65 years of age or older. The average household size was 2.67 and the average family size was 3.27.

The median age in the city was 30.6 years. 32.7% of residents were under the age of 18; 7.5% were between the ages of 18 and 24; 32.9% were from 25 to 44; 19.2% were from 45 to 64; and 7.6% were 65 years of age or older. The gender makeup of the city was 51.5% male and 48.5% female.

2000 census
As of the census of 2000, there were 362 people, 158 households, and 91 families living in the city. The racial makeup of the city was 98.07% White, 1.38% African American, 0.28% Native American, and 0.28% from two or more races. Hispanic or Latino of any race were 0.28% of the population.

There were 158 households, out of which 24.7% had children under the age of 18 living with them, 46.8% were married couples living together, 8.9% had a female householder with no husband present, and 41.8% were non-families. 34.8% of all households were made up of individuals, and 15.8% had someone living alone who was 65 years of age or older. The average household size was 2.29 and the average family size was 2.96.

22.9% are under the age of 18, 11.6% from 18 to 24, 32.3% from 25 to 44, 16.3% from 45 to 64, and 16.9% who were 65 years of age or older. The median age was 34 years. For every 100 females, there were 96.7 males. For every 100 females age 18 and over, there were 96.5 males.

The median income for a household in the city was $33,000, and the median income for a family was $51,042. Males had a median income of $37,500 versus $23,438 for females. The per capita income for the city was $20,397. None of the families and 4.7% of the population were living below the poverty line, including no under eighteens and 8.6% of those over 64.

Education
The community is within the North Polk Community School District.

References

Cities in Iowa
Cities in Polk County, Iowa
Des Moines metropolitan area
Populated places established in 1853
1853 establishments in Iowa